Carl Lebrecht Udo Dammer (born 8 January 1860 in Apolda, died 15 November 1920 in Großrambin near Kołobrzeg) was a German botanist. Dammer was also interested in entomology.

He was the son of Otto Dammer (1839–1916), an early advocate of the labor and Social Democratic movement in Germany.  Udo Dammer studied natural sciences in Berlin, and worked at the Botanical Garden in St. Petersburg from 1882 to 1886. Her earned in Ph.D. at the University of Freiburg in 1888.  From 1889, he worked at the Royal Botanical Museum in Berlin.  Dammer founded and edited the journal Blätter für Pflanzenfreunde.

Work
 Handbuch für Pflanzensammler. Stuttgart 1891.
 Anleitung für Pflanzensammler. Stuttgart 1894.
 Zimmerblattpflanzen. Berlin 1899.
 Balkonpflanzen. Berlin 1899.
 Theorie der Gartenarbeiten. Berlin 1899.
 Nadelhölzer. Berlin 1900.
 Palmen. Berlin 1900.
 Unsere Blumen und Pflanzen im Garten. Leipzig 1912.
 Schädlichen und der Essbar Taschenatlas Pilze. Esslingen aN 1914.
 Über die der Aufzucht Seidenspinners Raupe des ... . Frankfurt (Oder) 1915
 Wie wir ziehen Gemüse am besten? Berlin 1916.

Honours
Named in his honor:
 Gender
 Dammeria K. Schum. & Lauterbad. in the family Arecaceae
 species
 Dammeri is a specific epithet that refers to Carl Lebrecht Udo Dammer

References

 Groll, E. K. (Hrsg.): Biografien der Entomologen der Welt: Datenbank. Version 4.15: Senckenberg Deutsches Entomologisches Institut, 2010

External links

 

German entomologists
1860 births
1920 deaths
19th-century German botanists
20th-century German botanists